Criticism of monotheism has occurred throughout history. Mark S. Smith, an American biblical scholar and ancient historian, currently teaching at the  Princeton Theological Seminary, wrote that  monotheism has been a "totalizing discourse", often co-opting all aspects of a social belief system, resulting in the exclusion of "others". Accusers have painted monotheism as a cause of ignorance, oppression, and violence.

Contradictions
Through the means of defining, it is traditionally agreed among the major monotheistic religions that the one God is, inter alia, omnipotent, omniscient, and omnibenevolent. However, one scholar argues that "this definition of God [is] contradictory to what has been perceived by us in the empirical world."

Some feminist thinkers have criticized the monotheistic concept as the model of the highest form of patriarchal power. They argue that the one god is regarded to be male and opposed to everything related to change, sensuality, nature, feeling, and femininity.

Forcing one belief

David Hume (1711–1776) argues that monotheism is less pluralistic and thus less tolerant than polytheism, because monotheism stipulates that people pigeonhole their beliefs into one tenet.   In the same vein, Auguste Comte argues, "Monotheism is irreconcilable with the existence in our nature of the instincts of benevolence" because it compels followers to devote themselves to a single Creator. Jacob Neusner suggests that "the logic of monotheism ... yields little basis for tolerating other religions".

James Lovelock criticized monotheism due to its idea of a transcendent almighty father; he says about monotheism that it "seems to anesthetize the sense of wonder as if one were committed to a single line of thought by a cosmic legal contract".

Violence in monotheism
In modern times, ancient monotheism is blamed as the instigator of violence in its early days as it inspired the Israelites to wage war upon the Canaanites who believed in multiple gods.

Sarvepalli Radhakrishnan regarded monotheism to be one reason for violence; he said:

See also
 Criticism of religion

References

Monotheism
Monotheism